Morgan is an unincorporated community in South Fayette Township, Allegheny County, Pennsylvania, United States. Morgan has a post office with ZIP code 15064.

References

Unincorporated communities in Allegheny County, Pennsylvania
Unincorporated communities in Pennsylvania